Volodymyr Petrovych Zatonsky (July 27, 1888 – July 29, 1938) was a Soviet politician, academic, Communist Party activist, full member of the Ukrainian SSR Academy of Sciences (from 1929) and Academy of Sciences of the Soviet Union (from 1936).

Early life
Zatonsky was born in the village of Lysets in of Ushitsy (Ushytsia) Uyezd, Podolia Governorate, Russian Empire (now in Kamianets-Podilskyi Raion, Khmelnytskyi Oblast, Ukraine) into the family of a volost pysar.

Political career
He joined the Russian Social Democratic Labour Party (RSDLP) party as a Menshevik in 1905. In March 1917 he joined the Bolsheviks as the member of the Kyiv Committee, later joining the Kyiv revkom as well. He was one of few who initiated the organization of the Congress of the Workers-Peasants and Soldiers deputies as well as the military coup in Kyiv. Zatonsky participated in the fight against the Central Rada.

When the Red Army took over Kyiv in 1918 after the January Uprising, Zatonsky recalled that he only narrowly escaped execution as a counterrevolutionary when only Vladimir Lenin's mandate saved his life.

At the beginning of 1918 he was  the Head of the Ukrainian delegation from the Ukrainian People's Republic of Soviets for the Brest-Litovsk Peace Conference. From March 19 to April 18, 1918, he was Chairman of the All-Ukrainian Central Executive Committee. In July 1918 he was a commissar of a strike force against the Left Socialist-Revolutionary rebellion in Moscow.

Beginning in November 1918 he was the Narkom of People's Education. While in that post he did everything in his power to shut down the Kamyanets-Podilsky State University as the concentration of the counter-revolutionary forces of Symon Petliura. From 1968 to 1997 the institute was named after Zatonsky. He personally was offered a position by Lenin as a representative of the Soviet Ukrainian People's Republic in the Russian SFSR.

On November 17–30, 1918, Zatonsky, Vladimir Antonov-Ovseyenko and Joseph Stalin became members of the Revolutionary Military Council (RMC) of the Special Group of Kursk Troops. The RMC developed a military-strategic plan for the liberation of Ukraine, and began to staff the front with troops. The headquarters of the formation was located in Kursk. From November 30, 1918, Zatonsky was a member of the RMC of the Ukrainian Soviet Army.

In 1920 he was chairman of Galrevkom. In 1921 he received the Order of the Red Banner for the suppression of the Kronshtadt mutiny. Afterwards he held various government and Party positions in the Ukrainian Socialist Soviet Republic. In 1922 he was one of the persons who signed for the establishment of the Union of Soviet Socialist Republics as the representative of the Ukrainian SSR. In September 1933 Zatonsky was appointed as chief editor of the Ukrainian Soviet Encyclopedia.

Arrest and death
On November 3, 1937, he was arrested in a movie theater while he was with his family. Later the authorities conducted an unsanctioned search of his apartment searching for a proof of him being a spy for "bourgeois" Poland. After several days his wife was arrested as well. He was charged with being a member of an anti-Soviet Ukrainian nationalist center. On July 29, 1938, he was convicted after a 20-minute-long trial and sentenced to 10 years in prison without right of correspondence. During the Great Purge this was a euphemism for a death sentence, and the same day he was executed by firing squad. In 1956 Zatonsky, along with many others, was posthumously rehabilitated.

References

1888 births
1938 deaths
People from Khmelnytskyi Oblast
People from Ushitsky Uyezd
Mensheviks
Old Bolsheviks
Russian Social Democratic Labour Party members
Ukrainian communists
Ukrainian diplomats
Ukrainian revolutionaries
Soviet politicians
Politburo of the Central Committee of the Communist Party of Ukraine (Soviet Union) members
Chairmen of the All-Ukrainian Central Executive Committee
Education ministers of the Ukrainian Soviet Socialist Republic
Soviet foreign ministers of Ukraine
People of the Russian Revolution
Soviet people of the Ukrainian–Soviet War
Soviet rehabilitations
Great Purge victims from Ukraine